Stan Ageira (born 3 May 1961) is a writer from Mulki, a town near Mangalore, Karnataka, India. He is a popular Konkani language writer. He started writing at an early age of 14. He has written over 200 short stories and 14 novel in Konkani.

Early life
Ageira is well known in the field of Konkani literature. His first short story was published in 1975. when he was barely 14. To date he has written over 250 short stories and 18 novels in Konkani. His father, the late Sgt. Ligoury Ageira, served the Indian Air Force for 35 years. Ageira was born and brought up in Mulki with his primary education was completed in Bethany convent, high school from Government Junior College, B.Com from Mysore University and MBA from IBAM New Delhi. He began his professional career in sales with Godrej Soaps Mumbai Branch in the early eighties before moving to Dubai in the 1990. Presently he is working and living in Dubai with his wife, Yvonne, and children, Sean and Elton.

Literary works
He has been recognized and presented awards from Goa Konkani Bhasha Mandal, Konkani Kutaam Bahrain-2011, Daiji-Dubai 2014 Literary Award and Konkani Sahitya Academy, Karnataka for his novels. His novel Hi Moji Dhavnim won an AIKWO Award in 2014. He has published  work to his credit in Konkani, Kannada and English. His Konkani column "Bindaas" in daijiworld.com is popular with Konkani readers. His collection of short stories in Konkani, Tambdi Mirsaang, published in 2006, was selected for the Karnataka Konkani Sahitya Academy Award. His short stories have been published in magazines like Woman's Era and Alive, published from New Delhi. He was awarded as the Konkani Story writer of 2008 by daaiz.com, a web portal which promotes Konkani literature. His short stories in English are also available in www.daijiworld.com's specially dedicated column under "Red Chillis."

Short stories by Stan Ageira in English:

"Enemies"
"The Curse"
"The Missing Money"
"Affair"
"Non-Resident King"
"Guest on a stormy Night"
"Red Alert"
"The Verdict"
"An Idiot"
"The Gambler"
"Server Down" 
 "A Sacrificial Lamb"
 "First-Born"
 "A Postman's Pension"
 "His Dark Past"
 "The Windfall"
 "Hit and Run Case"
 "Cash Van Robbery"
 "Prime Minister's Wife"
 "Mahesh, Ragini & Their Good Luck"
 "Sizzler"
 "Anonymous from Cathill"
 "Deadly Evil"
 "Hacker and Password"
 "G.V.Herle"
 "Passion"
 "Rings of Smoke"
 "An Attack on Mynah's Nest"
 "Tell Me the Truth"
 "My Tenant, the Lawyer"
 "A Booze Merchant's Money"
 "His Picture Perfect Office"
 "Crush Pages"
 "The Threat"
 "A New Pastor's Newly Laid Lawn"
 "His Last Wish"
 "Meet Richie Rich from Stock Market"
 "A Tattered Wallet and an Outdated Cellphone"
 "Gold Trickery"
 "Shelter For A Night"
 "Life Partner"
 "The Gap"
 "Jammu Mail 4033"
 "Tooth Ache"
 "Venom"
 "Mixer"
 "Cook"
 "In Wet Conditions"
 "The Testament"
 "Burden"
 "The U-Turn"
 "The Spring Board"
 "Return Journey"
 "The Big Fight"
 "The Loser"
 "The Grand Finale"
 "Bedbugs"
 "One More Package"
 "Tea, Coffee and Cheesecake"
 "Garage"
 "Hibiscus"
 "A Green Signal"
 "Pressure Cooker"
 "The Temptation"
 "Red Chillis!"

References
https://www.daijiworld.com/chan/redChillies
https://books.google.com/books?id=1YILeUD_oZUC&pg=PA259&lpg=PA259&dq=Stan+Ageira&source=web&ots=Qr2lpV4iBr&sig=IHFn7mpE3qwwpW-3fEJ6yTyulEk&hl=en&sa=X&oi=book_result&resnum=1&ct=result
http://www.daijiworld.com/news/news_disp.asp?n_id=47969&n_tit=Mangalore%3A+Fans+Interact+With+Konkani+Author+Stan+Ageira++
http://www.konkanifriends.com/show_art.php?id=482&subid=78

External links
Raider Publishing International from New York has announced the release of Stan Ageira's collection of short stories titled 'Tea, Coffee and Cheesecake'. Following is the link for the news release:http://www.prlog.org/10626862-tea-coffee-and-cheese-cake-by-stan-ageira-now-available.html
Konkani Kutam, Bahrain, will confer Konkani Kutam award on Stan Ageira. Click the news link: http://www.deccanherald.com/content/176860/konkani-kutam-award-stan-ageira.html
http://www.daijiworld.com/news/news_disp.asp?n_id=109385
http://www.daijiworld.com/news/news_disp.asp?n_id=109668
Reviews: http://www.tower.com/details/review_all.cfm?wapi=115449838 
https://www.youtube.com/watch?v=dYbxqeiObtk
http://www.daijiworld.com/news/news_disp.asp?n_id=207278
http://www.daijiworld.com/news/news_disp.asp?n_id=215018 
http://www.daijiworld.com/news/news_disp.asp?n_id=265345 
http://www.daijiworld.com/news/news_disp.asp?n_id=269556 
http://www.daijiworld.com/news/news_disp.asp?n_id=270445

1961 births
Living people
Indian male novelists
Indian male short story writers
Writers from Mangalore
Mangaloreans
Konkani-language writers
Konkani short story writers
Indian expatriates in the United Arab Emirates
University of Mysore alumni
20th-century Indian novelists
20th-century Indian short story writers
Novelists from Karnataka
20th-century Indian male writers